The Myers Motors NmG (formerly the Corbin Sparrow) was a single-passenger, three-wheeled, battery electric vehicle designed specifically for commuting and city driving, produced from 1999 into the early 2010s.  It was initially produced by Corbin Motors, and made to order after 2005 by Myers Motors. It is a personal electric vehicle (PEV).

Description
Fuel efficiency is approximately 130 W·h/km (4.8 mi/(kW·h), which is equivalent to 162 mpg (US) or 194 mpg (UK) (1.45 L/100 km) using the DOE conversion.

Two models were produced:  the original "jelly bean" model and then a hatchback model, which was nicknamed "pizza butt" because it was designed for use by Domino's Pizza. Several Sparrows were featured in the feature films Austin Powers in Goldmember and Looper.

In June 2008, the website listed a price of $29,995 without taxes or shipping.

In February 2013 the NmG disappeared from the Myer Motors "Buy your NmG" page on their website, replaced by the 2 seat Duo.

Electrical system 

The Sparrow electrical system in a Corbin Sparrow VIN28 is composed of three isolated sections.  "Defanging" is the process of changing the circuit to disconnect the high voltage from the low voltage.

Line voltage  110 / 220 V AC
Battery charger (on-board charger made by Zivan). It can be replaced by a Manzanitamicro PFC-20 or PFC-30
Line voltage sensor

High voltage  156 V DC
 A 20 kW (continuous) 156-volt DC traction motor (Advanced DC Motors  diameter, part #203-06-4004) 
 Motor controller (Zark VIN 28, DCP or KiloVac EVCL controllers)
 Energy is supplied by a battery pack composed of thirteen 12-volt deep-cycle lead-acid Optima batteries.

Low voltage  13.5 V DC
 DC to DC converter
 Accessories: this includes cigarette lighter outlet, radio/CD player, ignition switch, cabin fan and heater, speedometer, horn, turn signals, automotive lighting (headlamps, taillamps and backup lamps), door switch, seat belt, brake alarms, power windows and windshield wiper.

See also 
 Electric motorcycles and scooters
 Electric vehicle

Other microcars and 3-wheel electric/hybrid automobiles
 List of microcars by country of origin
 HMV Freeway
 Messerschmitt KR200
 Aptera (solar electric vehicle)
 Commuter Cars Tango
 ja:Fuji Cabin
 Voiturette
 Cyclecar

References

External links 

 Myers Motors
 The 1st Sparrow Hatched
 Sparrow Photos
 If You Build Personal Transportation Modules, Will They Come?
 Corbin Sparrow at 3-wheelers.com

Production electric cars
Electric car models
Electric city cars
Electric three-wheel vehicles
Microcars
Cars introduced in 1999